Hungary will compete at the 2022 European Championships in Munich from August 11 to August 22, 2022.

Medallists

Competitors
The following is the list of number of competitors in the Championships:

Athletics

Cycling

Road

Men

Track

Elimination race

Keirin

Omnium

Points race

Scratch

Sprint

Team sprint

Time trial

BMX freestyle

Gymnastics

Hungary has entered five male and five female athletes.

Men

Qualification

Women

Qualification

Individual finals

Rowing

Men

Women

Triathlon

Men

Women

Mixed

References

2022
Nations at the 2022 European Championships
European Championships